Ádám Baranyai (born 5 March 1993) is a Hungarian professional footballer who plays for Csákvár.

Career statistics
.

References

External links
 
 

1993 births
Living people
Footballers from Budapest
Hungarian footballers
Association football defenders
BFC Siófok players
Rákospalotai EAC footballers
Csákvári TK players
Kisvárda FC players
Nemzeti Bajnokság I players
Nemzeti Bajnokság II players
21st-century Hungarian people